The Caucasus region, on the gateway between Southwest Asia, Europe and Central Asia, plays a pivotal role in the peopling of Eurasia,
possibly as early as during the Homo erectus expansion to Eurasia, 
in the Upper Paleolithic peopling of Europe, 
and again in the re-peopling Mesolithic Europe following the Last Glacial Maximum, and in the expansion associated with the Neolithic Revolution.

Lower to Middle Paleolithic
Dmanisi skull 5, found in Dmanisi, Georgia, is among the earliest Homo erectus fossils,  dated to 1.8 Ma.
Azykh Cave has remnants of the pre-Acheulean, estimated at 0.7 Ma.

Mousterian 
Mezmaiskaya cave (70–40 ka)

Upper Paleolithic to Epipaleolithic
Dzudzuana cave (30 ka)
Satsurblia cave (24 ka)
Damjili Cave
Dash Salakhly  (20 ka)

Gobustan National Park  (20–5 ka)
Trialetian  (16–8 ka)

Neolithic to Iron Age
Neolithic:
Shulaveri-Shomu culture  (8–6 ka)
Metsamor site (6 ka)

Bronze Age:
Maykop culture
Leyla-Tepe culture
Kura-Araxes culture
Trialeti culture
Jar-Burial Culture
Kurgan culture
Khojaly-Gadabay culture (c. 1300 – 600 BC)
Kingdom of Arme-Shupria (c. 1300 – 1190 BC)
Colchian culture (c. 2700 – 700 BC)
Koban culture (c. 1100 – 400 BC)

The South Caucasus gradually enters the historical period 
following the Bronze Age collapse,  see history of the Caucasus#Early_history
Kingdom of Diauehi (12th – 9th century BC)
Nairi (1114 – 860 BC)
Kingdom of Urartu (c. 860 – 590 BC)
Neo-Assyrian Empire (911 – 609 BC)

Genetic history

Language groups in the Caucasus have been found to have a close correlation to genetic ancestry.<ref>
O.Balanovsky et al., "Parallel Evolution of Genes and Languages in the Caucasus Region", Mol Biol Evol00 (2011), doi:10.1093/molbev/msr126.</ref>

A genetic study in 2015 by Jones et al. identified a previously unidentified lineage, which was dubbed Caucasian Hunter-Gatherer'' (CHG). The study detected a split between CHG and so-called "Western European Hunter-Gatherer" (WHG) lineages, about 45,000 years ago, the presumed time of the original peopling of Europe. CHG separated from the "Early Anatolian Farmers" (EAF) lineage later, at 25,000 years ago,  during the Last Glacial Maximum. (CHG was extrapolated from, among other sources, the genomes of two fossils from western Georgia – one about 13,300 years old (Late Upper Paleolithic) and the other 9,700 years (Mesolithic), which were compared to the 13,700 year-old Bichon man genome (found in Switzerland).

A genetic study in 2020 analysing samples from Klin-Yar communities, including the Koban culture, found that the ancient population had a high frequency of paternal Haplogroup D-Z27276, which is associated with the modern Tibetan people. Other haplogroups were Haplogroup J1 and Haplogroup G-M285.

See also
Prehistoric Georgia
Prehistoric Armenia
Prehistoric Azerbaijan
Scythia
Peoples of the Caucasus
Proto-Northwest Caucasian language
Caucasic languages
Dené-Caucasian

References